The rixdollar was the currency of British Ceylon until 1828. It was subdivided into 48 stivers, each of 4 duit. Units called the fanam and larin were also used, worth 4 and 9½ stiver, respectively. The currency derived from the Dutch rijksdaalder and stuiver, although the rijksdaalder was worth 50 stuiver.

Initially containing over 25 grams fine silver worth 4 shillings and  sixpence in the 17th century, the Ceylonese rixdollar was worth just one-third this amount by the 19th century. In 1825 it was replaced by the British pound at a rate of 1 rixdollar = 1 shillings, less than the Indian rupee which was worth about 1 shillings.

Coins

Silver coins were introduced in 1803 for 24, 48 and 96 stivers.

Silver rixdollar coins were issued in 1821.

Banknotes
The Government of Ceylon issued notes denominated in rixdollars, including 5 rixdollar notes in 1809 and 2 rixdollars in 1826.

References

Notes

Currencies of Sri Lanka
Coins of Sri Lanka
Modern obsolete currencies
1828 disestablishments